Malak Fakhar Zaman Khan Bangash is a Pakistani politician who had been a member of the National Assembly of Pakistan from February 2021 till July 2022.

Political career

He was elected to the National Assembly of Pakistan as a candidate of Pakistan Tehreek-e-Insaf from Constituency NA-45 (Tribal Area-VI) in 2021 by-election in the Constituency.

See also
 List of members of the 15th National Assembly of Pakistan

External links

References

Pakistan Tehreek-e-Insaf MNAs
Pakistani MNAs 2018–2023
Living people
Year of birth missing (living people)